Ingemar is a given name. People with the name include:

Ingemar Backman (born 1976), Swedish professional snowboarder
Ingemar Burgström (1926–1951), Swedish flyweight boxer
Olai Ingemar Eikeland (1915–2003), Norwegian politician for the Centre Party
Ingemar Erlandsson (born 1957), Swedish footballer
Ingemar Hedberg (born 1920), Swedish flatwater canoeist
Ingemar Hedenius (1908–1982), Swedish philosopher
Ingemar Johansson (1932–2009), Swedish boxer, former heavyweight champion of the world
Ingemar Johansson (racewalker) (1924–2009), Swedish athlete
Byron Ingemar Johnson (1890–1964), 24th Premier of British Columbia, Canada (1947–1952)
Ingemar Lindh (born 1945), Swedish theatre director and pedagogue
Ingemar Henry Lundquist (1921–2007), inventor and mechanical engineer
Ingemar Nilsson (born 1956), Swedish politician
Carl Ingemar Perstad, for 24 years host of the Swedish Broadcasting Company (SVT) motoring show Trafikmagasinet
Ingemar Ragnemalm, computer programmer, writer of the Sprite Animation Toolkit (SAT)
Ingemar Ståhl (1938–2014), Swedish economist
Ingemar Stenmark (born 1956), Swedish skier
Ingemar Svensson (1929–2004), Swedish rower
Ingemar Teever (born 1983), Estonian professional footballer
Ingemar Thillberg, Swedish footballer
Ingemar Vänerlöv (born 1944), Swedish Christian democratic politician

See also
Ivar

Norwegian masculine given names
Swedish masculine given names
Scandinavian masculine given names